
Krośnice  is a village in Milicz County, Lower Silesian Voivodeship, in south-western Poland. It is the seat of the administrative district (gmina) called Gmina Krośnice.

Count Adalbert von der Recke had established a Samaritan psychiatric hospital for children here in 1860, modeled after his orphanage in Düsseltal, Rhineland.

The village has a population of 1,800.

References

Villages in Milicz County